Shorea bracteolata is a species of plant in the family Dipterocarpaceae.  The species name bracteolata is derived from Latin (bracteolatus = with bracteoles) and refers to the persistent bracteoles of the inflorescence.

Description
S. bracteolata is an emergent tree, up to 50 m, found in mixed dipterocarp forests on well-drained clay and sandy soils. It is found in Sumatra, Peninsular Malaysia, Singapore and Borneo.

Wood
It is threatened by habitat loss. The timber is a light hardwood sold under the trade name white meranti.

References

bracteolata
Trees of Sumatra
Trees of Malaya
Trees of Borneo
Endangered plants
Taxonomy articles created by Polbot